The quinquennial Neronia was a massive Greek-style festival created by the Roman Emperor Nero. It consisted of three parts: first music, oratory and poetry, second gymnastics and the last horseriding.  

These games followed a tradition set by Julius Caesar and Augustus of having celebratory games to mark the anniversary of their reign.

The Neronia were a quinquennial event, which in this case wasn't counted inclusively but exclusively as the event took place every five years. The first Neronia was held in 60, 6 years after Nero's accesstion in 54, the second in 65. Nero's death and damnatio memoriae prevented a third installment.

References
Suetonius, The Lives of Twelve Caesars, Life of Nero 12
Tacitus, "Life of Lucanus", The Lives of the Poets 
Annals XIV.20 and XVI.2, and Cassius Dio, Roman History LXI.21.

Ancient Roman festivals
Nero
60s establishments in the Roman Empire
60s disestablishments in the Roman Empire
Quinquennial events